The 1916 Fordham Maroon football team was an American football team that represented Fordham University as an independent during the 1916 college football season. Under first-year head coach Frank Gargan, Fordham claims a 25–1–1 record. College Football Data Warehouse (CFDW) lists the team's record at 6–1–1. Opponents recognized by CFDW are displayed in bold in the schedule chart below.

Schedule

References

Fordham
Fordham Rams football seasons
Fordham Maroon football